A One Liner Schedule or One-Line Schedule is a filmmaking term for a shorter version of the shooting schedule. This type of schedule usually omits information about cast and location.

References

Film production
Film and video terminology